Oakland Assembly was a former Chevrolet manufacturing facility located in Elmhurst, Oakland, California. It was the first automobile plant established in Northern California to build Chevrolet vehicles. In 1916, Chevrolet opened the auto industry's first West Coast assembly plant in Oakland. Production of the Chevrolet Series 490 began on Sept. 23, 1916, while World War I was taking place (July 28, 1914 – November 11, 1918). 

The plant stopped producing automobiles for commercial use on January 30, 1942, until August 20, 1945, and contributed to the war effort during World War II producing munitions, Pratt & Whitney aircraft engines, 90mm guns and billions of pounds of aluminum forgings, magnesium castings and grey iron castings. The Chevrolet Fleetline remained in production during the war but only for military uses. It received the United States Army-Navy "E" Award for operational excellence. It was approximately 6 miles east of the former Naval Air Station Alameda.

When commercial manufacturing resumed, Chevrolet's most well known vehicles during the 1950s were built at the facility, to include the so called "Tri-Five" 1955–1957 Chevrolet coupes, sedans and station wagons. The factory was recognized that the facility needed to be upgraded for more modern manufacturing methods and in the summer of 1963, it was replaced by Fremont Assembly. It is now the Eastmont Town Center at the corner of 73rd Street and MacArthur Blvd.

Models
Some of the models produced at the plant included:
1915–1922 Chevrolet Series 490
1923–1926 Chevrolet Superior (introduction of GM "A" platform)
1927 Chevrolet Series AA Capitol
1928 Chevrolet Series AB National
1929 Chevrolet Series AC International
1930 Chevrolet Series AD Universal
1931 Chevrolet Series AE Independence
1932 Chevrolet Series BA Confederate
1933 Chevrolet Eagle
1933–1936 Chevrolet Standard Six
1933–1942 Chevrolet Master
1941–1952 Chevrolet Deluxe
1953–1957 Chevrolet 150/Chevrolet 210/Chevrolet Fleetline/Chevrolet Townsman
1960–1963 Chevrolet Corvair

See also
California during World War II
Military production during World War II
List of GM factories
General Motors Companion Make Program

References

External links
Photo of Oakland Assembly and manufactured Chevrolet ready for delivery
Oakland Wiki page for this factory

General Motors factories
Former motor vehicle assembly plants
Motor vehicle assembly plants in California
Companies based in Oakland, California
History of Oakland, California
Industrial buildings completed in 1916
Manufacturing companies based in the San Francisco Bay Area
Vehicle manufacturing companies established in 1916
Vehicle manufacturing companies disestablished in 1963
1916 establishments in California
1963 disestablishments in California
Defunct companies based in the San Francisco Bay Area